Stonebraker is a surname. Notable people with the surname include:

John Stonebraker (1918–2000), American football player
Michael Stonebraker (born 1943), American computer scientist

See also
 Stonebreaker